Selago triquetra is a species of plant in the family Scrophulariaceae. It is endemic to Western Cape Province, South Africa.

It has spreading-recurved leaves. Both its leaves and bracts are obtuse. 
It occurs from Piketberg to Montagu.

References

Endemic flora of South Africa
Renosterveld
triquetra
Least concern plants